Sławomir Witold Nitras  (born 26 April 1973 in Połczyn-Zdrój) is a Polish politician, political scientist, member of Civic Platform (PO), an MP in the lower house of Parliament from 2015 Member of the Sejm.

Biography 
He was educated at the University of Szczecin, graduating in 1998 in Political Science from the Faculty of Humanities. From 1997 to 1998 he was employed as a lecturer at the Institute of Philosophy and Political Science at the University of Szczecin.

From 1998 to 1999 he was manager of the Koszalin voivodeship Governor’s office, and in 1999 - 2002 sat on the Board of the Kruszywa Koszalin PLC mines. He spent the following three years running his own business.

From 1998 to 2002 he was a Solidarity Election Action (AWS) councillor in the Western Pomeranian voivodeship sejmik. He was elected a Civic Platform (PO) MP for Szczecin in the 2005 getting 14238 votes in 41 Szczecin district and 2007 parliamentary elections, gaining  65,993 votes in 2007 (the highest individual number of votes in the constituency since 1989). During both terms in office he was a member of the Treasury Committee and in his second term he was also a member of the Economy Committee and the Accessible Government Extraordinary Committee.

He was elected to the European Parliament in 2009 for the Gorzów constituency, with 107,413 votes. He sits with the Group of the European People’s Party (Christian Democrats) and is also a member of the Committee on Economic and Monetary Affairs and of the delegation to the EU-Russia Parliamentary Cooperation Committee. In 2014 won't seek re-election. 2 December in this same year became main adviser in political cabinet of  Prime Minister Ewa Kopacz In parliamentary election in 2015 he became Member of  Polish Parliament by 20 930 votes. He is the chairman of the delegation of the Sejm and Senate of Poland to the Parliamentary Assembly of the OSCE.

From 1991 to 1993 he was a member of the Real Politics Union, and from 1996 to 2001 belonged to the Conservative People’s Party. Since 2001 he has been a member of Civic Platform (PO) and is a member of the National Executive. Since 2003 he has been the leader of PO in Szczecin, and since 2006  Vice-Chairman of the PO Regional Executive in Western Pomerania.

Personal life 
He is married to Irmina and has two daughters, Natalia and Kornelia.

See also 
 List of Sejm members (2005–2007)
 List of Sejm members (2007–2011)

Sources 
 European Parliament website profile
 Polish Parliament website

External links 
 Official website of Sławomir Nitras 

1973 births
Living people
University of Szczecin alumni
Academic staff of the University of Szczecin
Civic Platform politicians
Solidarity Electoral Action politicians
Civic Platform MEPs
MEPs for Poland 2009–2014
Members of the Polish Sejm 2005–2007
Members of the Polish Sejm 2007–2011
Members of the Polish Sejm 2015–2019
Members of the Polish Sejm 2019–2023
People from Połczyn-Zdrój